Aparecida may refer to:

 Our Lady of Aparecida, the patron saint of Brazil
Places:
 Aparecida, a municipality in São Paulo, Brazil
 Aparecida, Paraíba, a municipality in Paraíba, Brazil
 Aparecida do Taboado, a municipality in Mato Grosso do Sul, Brazil
 Conceição da Aparecida, a municipality in Minas Gerais, Brazil
 Aparecida do Rio Negro, a municipality in Tocantins, Brazil
 Nossa Senhora Aparecida, a municipality in Sergipe, Brazil
 Aparecida de Goiânia, a municipality in Goiás, Brazil
 Aparecida do Rio Doce, a municipality in Goiás, Brazil
 a common name for the parish Torno, Portugal